Succineidae are a family of small to medium-sized, air-breathing land snails (and slugs), terrestrial pulmonate gastropod molluscs in the superfamily Succineoidea.

They are commonly called amber snails because their thin fragile shells are translucent and amber-colored.  They usually live in damp habitats such as marshes.

Succineidae is the only family in the superfamily Succineoidea.

The soft parts of the animal appear to be too large for the shell.

Anatomy
In this family, the number of haploid chromosomes varies greatly. The most common totals are less than 10, and also lies between 21 and 25, but other values are also possible (according to the values in this table).

Taxonomy
The family Succineidae contains two subfamilies (according to the taxonomy of the Gastropoda by Bouchet & Rocroi, 2005):
 Succineinae Beck, 1837 - synonyms: Hyalimacinae Godwin-Austen, 1882; Oxylomatinae Schileyko & I. M. Likharev, 1986
 Catinellinae Odhner, 1950

Genera
Genera in the family Succineidae include:

 † Eoquickia Harzhauser & Neubauer in Harzhauser et al., 2016 
 † Papyrotheca Brusina, 1893 
 † Suratia Hamilton-Bruce & Kear, 2010

 Catinellinae Odhner, 1950
 Catinella Pease, 1870
 Indosuccinea Rao, 1924
 Mediappendix Pilsbry, 1948
 Quickella C. Boettgger, 1939
 Quickia Odhner, 1950

 Oxylomatinae Schileyko & Likharev, 1986
 Oxyloma Westerlund, 1885

 Succineinae Beck, 1837
 Austrosuccinea Iredale, 1937
 Boninosuccinea Habe, 1956
 Camptonyx Benson, 1858
 Helisiga Lesson, 1831
 Hyalimax H. Adams & A. Adams, 1855
 † Laxisuccinea Cooke, 1921 
 Lithotis W. T. Blanford, 1863
 Neosuccinea Matekin, 1956
 Novisuccinea Pilsbry, 1948
 Omalonyx d’Orbigny, 1837
 Pamirsuccinea Schileyko & Likharev, 1986
 Spirancinea Iredale, 1945
 Succinea Draparnaud, 1801
 Succinella Mabille, 1871

Nomen nudum
 Papusuccinea Iredale, 1941

Synonyms
 Subfamily Hyalimacinae Godwin-Austen, 1882: synonym of Succineinae H. Beck, 1837
 Subfamily Oxylomatinae Schileyko & I. M. Likharev, 1986: synonym of Succineinae H. Beck, 1837
 Amphibina W. Hartmann, 1821: synonym of Succinea Draparnaud, 1801
 Amphibulima Gistel, 1848: synonym of Succinea Draparnaud, 1801 (Invalid: unnecessary substitute name for Succinea; also a junior homonym of Amphibulima Lamarck, 1805)
 Arborcinea Iredale, 1937: synonym of Succinea Draparnaud, 1801
 Brachyspira L. Pfeiffer, 1855 †: synonym of Succinea (Brachyspira) L. Pfeiffer, 1855 represented as Succinea Draparnaud, 1801
 Cerinasota Iredale, 1939: synonym of Succinea Draparnaud, 1801
 Cochlohydra A. Férussac, 1821: synonym of Succinea Draparnaud, 1801
 Homalonyx Ancey, 1881: synonym of Omalonyx d'Orbigny, 1838 (unjustified emendation)
 Hydrophyga Lindholm, 1927: synonym of Succinella Mabille, 1871
 Hydrotropa Lindholm, 1927: synonym of Oxyloma Westerlund, 18854* Lucena Hartmann, 1821: synonym of Succinea Draparnaud, 1801
 Neohyalimax Simroth, 1896: synonym of Omalonyx d'Orbigny, 1838
 Succinastrum J. Mabille, 1871: synonym of Succinea Draparnaud, 1801
 Succinoides Schileyko, 1967: synonym of Oxyloma (Succinoides) Schileyko, 1967 represented as Oxyloma Westerlund, 1885
 Tapada S. Studer, 1820: synonym of Succinea Draparnaud, 1801
 Truella Pease, 1871: synonym of Succinea Draparnaud, 1801

Conservation status
The World Conservation Union (IUCN) considers five species or subspecies of ambersnail as threatened with extinction, and a further three species are categorized as "data deficient" which were previously considered Vulnerable or Extinct, and two species are listed as Near Threatened.

Threatened species
Oxyloma kanabense - Kanab Ambersnail, Critically Endangered
Succinea piratarum - Endangered
Succinea quadrasi - Endangered
Boninosuccinea ogasawarae - Vulnerable
Boninosuccinea punctulispira - Vulnerable

Assigned other IUCN categories
Catinella arenaria - Sandbowl Snail, Near Threatened
Succinea sanctaehelenae - Near Threatened
Succinea guamensis - Data Deficient, previously considered Extinct
Succinea chittenangoensis - Chittenago Ovate Ambersnail - Data Deficient, previously Vulnerable
Succinea philippinica - Data Deficient, previously Vulnerable

References

External links
 Bouchet, P., Rocroi, J.-P. (2005). Classification and nomenclator of gastropod families. Malacologia. 47(1-2): 1-397.